The Saturn S-series is a family of compact cars from the Saturn automobile company of General Motors.  Saturn pioneered the brand-wide "no-haggle" sales technique.

The automobile platform, the Z-body, was developed entirely in-house at Saturn, and it shared very little with the rest of the General Motors model line.  It implemented a spaceframe design, used on the Pontiac Fiero during the 1980s, with non-load-carrying side panels made of plastic instead of metal. These polymer panels were dent-resistant, something that remained a selling point for Saturn until just a few years before the Saturn brand was discontinued.

The S series was marketed from the fall of 1990 for the 1991 model year through the end of the 2002 model year. Significant design updates were made in 1996, 1997, and 2000 for all cars. Although nearly every year of the S-series's existence brought some minor changes to the architecture of the car, each model kept the same basic body styling throughout its respective production period.

History
The S-series debuted for model year 1991 with the Sport Coupe (SC) and Sedan Level (SL) models. The SC was only available with the DOHC (Dual Overhead Cam) engine whereas the SLs had an option for the SOHC (Single Overhead Cam) engine (SL1) or the DOHC (SL2).

For the 1993 model year, the SC gained an SOHC option (SC1) in addition to the existing DOHC option (SC2, renamed from SC). The SL & SC families were joined by the SW (Station Wagon) models, in both SW1 and SW2 flavors.

The S series all used either the SOHC LK0/L24 or the DOHC LL0 version of the completely original, designed in-house Saturn 1.9L engine. SL1s, SC1s, and SW1s were only offered with the MP2 manual transmission and the MP6 automatic, while SL2, SC2 and SW2 models came with either the MP3 manual or MP7 automatic. The only difference in each case is the selection of gear ratios, with the SOHC-associated transmissions being geared taller for more efficiency, and the DOHC-associated transmissions having shorter, more closely spaced ratios for performance. As a result, it's not uncommon for enthusiast-owners to swap a tall-geared MP2 manual into a car equipped with a DOHC engine for better fuel economy on the highway.

Aside from the engine and transmission, the level 2 models also included 15-inch instead of 14-inch wheels, a correspondingly larger tire size, EVO steering, a rear swaybar, the option of rear disc brakes (standard on the 1991-1992 SC), color-matched bumpers and door handles, and more interior options such as power locks, power windows, rear defroster, & a sunroof (SC2 only). Aside from the wheel size, it was almost impossible to tell a 1 from a 2 externally, except for the SC2s which had retractable headlamps throughout model year 1996.

A redesign beginning with the 1999 model year gave the SC a small suicide door (more correctly a clamshell door) on the driver's side to improve rear-seat access. This type of door had previously been used in extended cab pickup trucks, but was an innovation in coupe design.

The level 1 S-series equipped with a manual transmission were among the most fuel-efficient cars available in the United States when they were produced, reaching  in EPA highway tests at the time (this would likely translate to  under current methodologies).

The S-series was replaced by the Saturn ION for model year 2003.

Export markets
Taiwan and Japan were the only two Asian countries to import Saturns. From 1992 to 1996, the first- and second-generation sedans plus the first-generation coupes were sold in Taiwan. From 1997 to 2001, the second-generation versions were sold in right-hand drive in Japan. Some Toyota Netz dealerships and former Isuzu dealerships also offered Saturn products until 2001.

Canada imported all available Saturn models from 1992 onward.

First generation

First generation SL

The first generation SL was constructed for model years 1991 through 1995, with the first Saturn rolling off the assembly line in the Spring Hill, Tennessee factory on July 30, 1990, the same day that then-CEO of GM, Roger Bonham Smith, retired. It was maroon with a tan interior.

From 1991 to 1992, the Saturn SL-series Sedan trim levels consisted of the SL, the SL1, and the SL2.

The base SL model featured the MP2 5-speed manual transmission only, and it had manual steering. On the exterior, the car featured unique hubcaps different from the SL1 and came equipped with only a driver's side exterior mirror (a passenger mirror was a popular dealer-installed option). On the inside, the SL featured a standard AM/FM radio with no cassette player and lower-grade cloth material on the seats. Some factory options such as power windows, power locks, or cruise control were not available on the SL but Air-conditioning and an AM/FM/Cassette radio were available on the option sheet. The SL1 trim level added power steering, a passenger mirror, different hubcaps for the 14-inch wheels, an AM/FM cassette player, and softer cloth material on the seats. It featured as standard equipment the same MP2 manual or the MP6 4-speed automatic transmission could be had as an option. The SL1 could be optioned with power windows, power locks, power mirror (passenger side only - driver's side retained manual control), cruise control, and air conditioning. Both were offered only with the SOHC 1.9L I4 "LKO" engine that produced , which was rated at 27 mpg (8.7L/100 km/32 mpg) City, 34 mpg (6.9L/100 km; 41 mpg) Highway. The SL2 also brought body-color bumpers, 15-inch steel wheels (alloys were optional), and higher spec cloth on the seats (including the seatbacks - on SL and SL1 the seatbacks were vinyl). SL2's could be optioned with power windows, locks, mirror (again, pass. side only), cruise control, air conditioning, sunroof, and leather seats. Anti-lock brakes were available as an option as well, which brought along rear disc brakes.

For the 1995 model year, the seatbelts were changed from the power passive restraint type to the conventional 3-point type. The interior of the vehicle was redesigned with a new dashboard and the addition of a front passenger's airbag. The center console was updated as well, adding previously absent cup holders. Also for 1995, the SOHC (LK0) engine was given MPFI to create the  L24 engine.

Owners of the base model typically report real-world fuel mileage of about 38–41  mpg-US (6.2–5.7 L/100 km; 46–49 mpg-imp) on the highway with the manual transmission.

First generation SW

For the 1993 model year, a station wagon variant of the SL was added to the model lineup. This was offered in SW1 and SW2 trim levels. The station wagon used the same doors as the sedan, but the bodywork behind the C-pillar and the roof differed.

First generation SC

The first generation Saturn SC coupes were made from 1990 until 1996. The first generation Saturn SC coupes were originally only available in one trim level which was the SC.

For the 1993 model year, the original regular SC coupe model was renamed as the SC2 and a new SC1 trim level was introduced. For the 1994 model year, the SC1 and the SC2 had both gotten revised power door locks and a recalibrated automatic transmission. The first generation SC2 had received a minor refresh in 1995 in which the lower front bumper and the vehicle's taillights were both updated. For the 1995 model year, both the SC1 and the SC2 had gotten a redesigned interior with a new redesigned dashboard with a front passenger's airbag.

The SC1's engine was later upgraded to the  L24 engine for the 1995 model year.

The first generation Saturn SC1 coupes shared the same fixed headlight front fascia as the SL sedans and the SW station wagons, rather than the pop-up headlight design used on the SC2 and the original SC. The SC1 also lacked a rear trunk lid reflector and a rear stabilizer bar.

SL3 
For the 1994 model year, a highest-trim "SL3" model was planned. Saturn owner's manuals from this period made mention to the SL3- it would have featured an SC front end on an SL2 body, with all options as standard. An inline-six engine derived from the 1.9L was to be offered.

Second generation

Second generation SL and SW

The second generation SL sedans and SW station wagons were made from 1996 to 1999. They had both featured a completely redesigned exterior. The interior was mostly the same as on the first generation vehicles, while mechanically they went largely untouched. The redesigned second generation S-series went on sale in 1995 for the 1996 model year.

A few minor changes were made for the 1998 model year S-series vehicles. Due to multiple complaints about the noise coming from the vehicle's trip odometer that had been in all of the Saturn S-series since 1995, had replaced with a new type of trip odometer in an effort to correct the problem. For the 1998 model year, a new cluster with a digital trip odometer had been introduced. Rear disc-brakes were no longer available as an option on the S series due to high costs for them as well as very little improvement in braking performance over the conventional rear drum-brakes setup.

Beginning with all of the Saturn S-series vehicles that were made in late 1999 (sometimes referred to as 1999.5 models) had received improvements to both the SOHC and the DOHC engines in the S series. These changes included revised pistons, new connecting rods, and new crankshaft counterweights in the engine as well. The Twin Cam cylinder head had now featured a new roller-rocker setup with hydraulic tappets and roller cams replacing the conventional bucket lifter setup of the previous engine in the S series.

Also introduced for the 1999 model year S-series vehicles that were sold in California was a different type of exhaust manifold that housed an upstream catalytic converter (this converter had heated up much faster than the conventional unit, and it had also decreased exhaust emissions faster as well), and it also had provisions for an air-injection reaction system (This had injected fresh air into the exhaust to reduce hydrocarbons during the startup of the vehicle, as it would help the oxygen sensors and catalytic converters reach their operating temperatures faster). These vehicles were made to meet the all-new CARB ULEV standards for the 1999 model year.

Second generation SC

The second generation SC coupes were made from 1997 until 2002. The second generation SC coupes had also moved to the longer wheelbase that the SL sedans and the SW station wagons had used, resulting in an equal wheelbase length across all S-series models. The redesign had resulted in a more curved look for the SC coupes, which gave a slight increase in the vehicle's interior room/space, as well as a completely redesigned exterior of the vehicle itself. For the 1999 model year, a front-opening clamshell door was added to the driver's side of the vehicle. Even though this door on the driver's side of the vehicle had allowed easier access into the vehicle's rear seat, the driver's seat in the vehicle was also able to slide forward to allow easy access to the vehicle's rear seat as well. As a clamshell door, the rear driver's side door could not open unless the front door was open, because the door handle was on the inside of the door itself. Like the first generation SC coupes, the SC1 model lacked a rear sway bar.

Third generation

Third generation SL and SW

In 1999 for the 2000 model year, the Saturn S-series had been redesigned for the final time before being discontinued in 2002. This resulted in the third generation Saturn S-series.

The exterior of the Saturn SL sedans received new body panels from the belt-line down. The rear end of the SL sedans received a redesigned applique on the trunk, and the headlights of the SL sedans had received orange turn signal indicators.

The interior of all the Saturn S-series models received a completely redesigned dashboard, center console, and steering wheel, but the rest of the interiors were mostly unchanged. The SL2, SW2, and SC2 got the storage compartment with a sliding armrest in the center console as standard, whereas the SL1, SW1, and SC1 did not.

Like the 1999 model year SL sedans and the 1999 model year SW station wagons that were made in late in 1999, the 2000 model year SL sedans and the 2000 model year SW station wagons had also included a digital trip odometer, which did not cause any issues like the analog trip odometers that were used in the 1991-early 1999 model year S-series vehicles.

The third generation Saturn S-series was also the first Saturn to use the body control module (BCM), and the powertrain control module (PCM) systems in tandem with each other. In the third generation Saturn S-series models, the PCM system was used strictly for the vehicle's transmission and engine, whereas the BCM system was used strictly for the vehicle's interior functions such as the digital trip odometer and speedometer.

Beginning with the 2001 model year, side curtain airbags became available as an optional feature. The optional side curtain airbags were only available on the 2001 to 2002 model Saturn SL1 and SL2 sedans.

Third generation SC 

The third generation of Saturn SC continued to be available in SC1 and SC2 models. While retaining the previous generation's bodywork, it was facelifted with redesigned fascias front and rear, as well as new headlamps and tail lamps. The front fenders and door panels were also changed, continuing the character line all the way down to the fog light beneath the front bumper. A PCM and BCM were added. A new GT trim package had become available for the Saturn SC coupes for the 2001 model year, along with the option of American Racing Wheels that was only available on the GT version of the Saturn SC coupes. A rear spoiler on the vehicle's rear trunk lid was also made available for the 2001 to 2002 model year Saturn SC GT coupes.

Special edition Saturns

A special Homecoming edition of the SL2 was released for 1994. It had special Pearl White paint (a "silver-tint" pearl, shared with Cadillac models of this year), black Saturn emblems, spoiler,  "teardrop" wheels, anti-lock four-wheel disc brakes, grey leather/cloth interior, rear headrests, fog lamps, and power locks and windows. Options included a sunroof, CD player, and the 4-speed automatic with traction control.

In 1998 and 1999, prospective buyers of a red or white SC2 had the option of purchasing the "Black Top Coupe Package" for $225.00 (US). The models were referred to as the "Red Hot Coupe" or "White Hot Coupe", based on the exterior color. The package came with a black roof panel, black outside rearview mirrors, black emblems, white face gauges and black accented teardrop wheels. These are extremely rare.

In 1999, a second Homecoming Edition was produced in a special "Mint Color" with tan leather interior, special off-white gauge faceplates, and black Saturn badges to commemorate the second "Homecoming" visit to the Spring Hill, Tennessee manufacturing facility. The 1999 Homecoming Edition also had the same features offered as the 1994 Homecoming Edition.

In 2001, a special yellow SC2 coupé model was also built. The model was officially named "Limited Edition", but soon became known as the "Bumblebee Edition". 99 were produced, each with a certificate of authenticity. The "Bumblebee Edition" included embroidered headrests, black leather interior with yellow leather inserts on the seats and door panels, black roof and mirrors, number designation inside the fuel filler door, and a certificate of authenticity. These are not to be confused with the regular issue Yellow Sport Coupe.

For the 2001 model year only, a special edition of the Saturn SL2 sedan that was called the Saturn SL2 10th Anniversary Edition (also known as the Silver Anniversary Edition) was made available. The Saturn SL2 10th Anniversary Edition had included several upscale features that were not available on any other Saturn S-series vehicles like power windows, leather interior, standard side curtain airbags, and several other upscale features. The Saturn SL2 10th Anniversary Edition also had "Saturn 10th Anniversary" stitched onto the front seat adjustable leather headrests. The Saturn SL2 10th Anniversary Edition had also featured a rear spoiler on the vehicle's rear trunk lid.

Right-hand drive
In addition to the above-mentioned "Special Edition" Saturns; there was also the 1999–2001 Saturn SWP "Postal" station wagon that were produced (450 in 1999), intended to be marketed to rural route mail carriers. These station wagons were right-hand-drive vehicles.

There were also a limited number of Saturns that were exported to Japan as right-hand-drive vehicles circa between 1997 and 2000 (during the lifetime of the second-generation model). Aside from having the steering wheel on the other side, Japanese market Saturns were also fitted with slightly different light units. The rear lamps had amber turn signals and the front indicators were mounted closer to the corners rather than inboard. The SL and SW's engine displacement and dimensions were within the Japanese government's dimension regulations and engine tax brackets (as only 1.9-liter engines were offered for the second-generation models), although the SC did not meet the dimension regulations and would have been subjected to annual taxes.

Saturn faced a hard time in Japan, where it played directly into the strengths of the Japanese manufacturers, comparing unfavorably with better-priced and more competent Japanese compact cars. The interior, especially, received criticism. A mere 602 units were sold in Saturn's first year in Japan (April to December 1997).

Another problem was that Japanese car dealers have always excelled at customer service; this meant that Saturn's main sales argument in the United States was meaningless in the Japanese market. The introduction of Saturn was also ill-timed, as the economy was in the midst of a recession due to the effects of the 1980s "bubble economy". As the Japanese had less money to spend on "luxury goods", as imported products are regarded, Saturn found very few buyers.

Theft
The 1995 Saturn SL was the most stolen vehicle in 2003, while the 1994 SL took third place in CCC Information Services's 2003 most stolen vehicle report. According to the Lynnwood, Washington police department, when use of the key wears on the door and ignition mechanisms, a filed blank key can be used to open the door and start the engine.

Racing
Saturn SC's competed in the SCCA World Challenge in the 1990s, winning several races from 1995 to 1997.
Several S-series cars have been used as rally race cars. S-Series cars are also popular in dirt oval racing and autocross.

Safety

Insurance Institute for Highway Safety (IIHS)

NHTSA

Production numbers
Listed below is a rough estimate on the numbers of S series produced from 1990 to 2002.

References

Compact cars
Front-wheel-drive vehicles
S series
Coupés
Sedans
Station wagons
2000s cars
Cars introduced in 1990
Motor vehicles manufactured in the United States
Cars discontinued in 2002